Grace Community Church is a non-denominational, evangelical megachurch founded in 1956 and located in Sun Valley, a neighborhood in the San Fernando Valley of Los Angeles. Noted speaker and radio evangelist John MacArthur is the senior pastor of Grace Community Church. As of 2008, the average weekly attendance was 8,258.

History
The church was founded as Grace Community Church of the Valley as a mission of First Presbyterian Church of Hollywood. The congregation held its first public service on July 1, 1956, calling Don Householder (former associate pastor of Trinity Methodist Church and pastor of Country Church of Hollywood) to be its founding pastor. Within a few years, the church had moved to its present location on Roscoe Boulevard, and the decision was made to hold two Sunday morning services to accommodate the growing congregation.

Following Householder's death in 1965, Richard Elvee was called to be pastor and the church continued to grow under his leadership until he died in 1968. In February 1969, John F. MacArthur assumed the pastorate. During the early days of MacArthur's ministry, the church doubled in size every two years, which led to the building of the Family Life Center in 1971 and a new Worship Center in 1977. In 1972, Moody Monthly magazine published a feature article about the congregation titled "The church with nine hundred ministers". 

In August 2020, amid the COVID-19 pandemic, the church leadership permitted defiance of local health orders by not wearing masks or social distancing. "The good news is, you're here, you're not distancing, and you're not wearing masks," Pastor MacArthur told the congregation. "And it's also good news that you're not outside, because it's very hot out there. So the Lord knew we needed to be inside and unmasked." The State of California and Los Angeles County attempted to prevent the church from holding large indoor services during the COVID-19 pandemic. In the legal battles that started as a result of the faith-driven defiance, Grace Community Church was represented by Jenna Ellis, Senior Legal Advisor to the Trump 2020 Campaign. 

In early September 2020, the county of Los Angeles Public Works Department sent a notice to the church advising them of the termination of the church's parking lot lease along the water viaduct, which the church had held since 1975. Lawyers for Grace Community said this move by the county was in response to the church's decision to hold indoor worship services during the pandemic. Restrictions were lifted November 12, 2020. 

On October 22, 2020, three cases of COVID-19 cases were reported among Grace Community Church attendees. In a statement, Jenna Ellis admitted that the positive COVID-19 cases had been confirmed but disputed the use of the word "outbreak" based on the fact only 3 had been reported. The Department of Public Health, however, defines an outbreak as 3 or more cases.  Grace Community Church continued with in-person services the following Sunday in defiance of a court order requiring the church to stop. 

In March 2022 during the annual Shepherds' Conference, it was announced that Grace Community Church would produce The Essential Church, a feature-length documentary about the church's response to COVID-19 restrictions. 

In March 2022, the Roys Report alleged Grace Community Church advised a woman to stay with a physically and sexually abusive husband. The woman was excommunicated from the church; her husband was later sentenced to 21 years to life for child physical and sexual abuse . This instance was reported on by Christianity Today in February 2023 with further details, after an interview with ex-Grace Community Church Elder Hohn Cho.

Distinctives
 Grace Community Church is elder-ruled, and being within the Evangelical Protestant tradition, is not to be confused with mainstream evangelicalism. It teaches Calvinist theology, although it is not aligned with a denomination. Grace Community Church holds to the beliefs of the cessation of supernatural spiritual gifts, Lordship salvation, and the sufficiency of Scripture. The church teaches believer's baptism by immersion.

See also
 The Master's University
 The Master's Seminary

References

External links
 Grace Community Church website
 Grace Books
 Grace to You media ministry of John MacArthur

Evangelical churches in California
Christian organizations established in 1956
Evangelical megachurches in the United States
Megachurches in California
Churches in Los Angeles
1956 establishments in California
Sun Valley, Los Angeles